The Savannah Braves were a Minor League Baseball team of the Southern League and the Double-A affiliate of the Atlanta Braves from 1971 to 1983. They were located in Savannah, Georgia, and played their home games at Grayson Stadium. The franchise relocated to Greenville, South Carolina, as the Greenville Braves, after the 1983 season.

Year-by-year record

Notable alumni

See also
Savannah Indians
Savannah Sand Gnats

References

Defunct Southern League (1964–present) teams
Baseball teams established in 1971
Atlanta Braves minor league affiliates
Professional baseball teams in Georgia (U.S. state)
Baseball teams disestablished in 1983
Defunct baseball teams in Georgia